The Villa Magna Condominium Complex was an urban development that was planned to rise on a  plot in Brickell, downtown Miami, Florida. It was approved in 2006 by the city council and the Federal Aviation Administration and construction was slated to begin in April 2007. The ending date was approximated to be late 2008 or early 2009; however, the housing crisis of the late 2000s halted the project. The project was revived as The Towers by Foster + Partners in 2016, after FAA approval of supertall heights (>1,000 ft). Done in the early 2020s the site was sold again to Citadel Group who planned a move to Miami from Chicago.

History

The complex was to feature two twin towers, Villa Magna Condominiums I and Villa Magna Condominiums II. The complex was to be connected by the Villa Magna Plaza at the base of both towers. It was to be located at 1201 Brickell Bay Drive near Southeast 12th Street in Miami's Brickell neighborhood. The buildings were planned be used entirely for residential purposes, with the complex containing 780 condominium units. However, in 2007 the developers changed the plans to include more hotel, retail, and commercial space in realization of the quickly declining housing market at the time. The complex was then approved under a major use special permit.

Revival

In 2011, the project plans were rumored to have been revived.

The Towers by Foster + Partners
In November 2016, new rendering were revealed for the project, renamed The Towers by Foster + Partners, again a twin tower project, but much taller and with 660 units. The new design features more mixed-use and public space at the base, with much of the parking underground, a difficult task in Miami due to very low elevation. The buildings would be the tallest buildings in Miami, beating FECR's own under construction  Panorama Tower two blocks north on Brickell Bay Drive. FECR sold the site in 2022.

See also
List of tallest buildings in Miami

References

External links
Future skyscrapers of Miami
Villa Magna Complex from Emporis
Villa Magna I from Emporis
Villa Magna II from Emporis

Residential condominiums in Miami
Residential skyscrapers in Miami
Twin towers
2000s in Florida